Guntupalle is a village in Eluru District of the Indian state of Andhra Pradesh. It is located in Kamavarapukota mandal of Eluru revenue division. It is located at a distance of 42 km from district headquarters Eluru city. It is well known tourist destination famously known for Guntupalli caves. The nearest train station is Eluru railway station.

Demographics 

 Census of India, Guntupalle had a population of 4113. The total population constitutes 2086 males and 2027 females, a sex ratio of 972 females per 1000 males. 395 children are in the age group of 0–6 years, a child sex ratio of 946 girls per 1000 boys. The average literacy rate stands at 70.06%.

References

Villages in Eluru district